Orhei is a district in central Moldova, with its administrative center in the city of Orhei. As of 2014 Moldovan Census its population was 101,502.

History

The Orhei region has been inhabited since the Stone Age. Settlements included the ancient city of Getae (located near  modern Trebujeni). Getae stood from the eighth to the second century BC and was abandoned after an invasion by a Germanic tribe, the Bastarnae. Non-fortified settlements were located on the riverbank. A medieval fortress of earth and wood was later constructed near the former site of Getae, which stood from the 12th to the 14th century AD. During the 14th century, the Golden Horde occupied the region; the town was conquered, and its name changed to Shehr al Jedid. From 1363 to 1365, Horde leader Abdullah Khan resided in Shehr al Jedid. At the end of the 14th century, the Horde were driven out and the empire dissolved; the eastern city evolved, acquiring Moldovan characteristics. During the reign of Stephen the Great the stone city was repaired, equipped with artillery and became the residence of Orhei's governor. The stone fortress was destroyed. About 1600, Prince Ieremia Movilă unsuccessfully attempted to rebuild the city, and in 1665 a cave monastery was built in the area. In 1773, the Curchi monastery was built  near the Vatici. After the 1812 Treaty of Bucharest, Bessarabia was occupied by the Russian Empire until 1917. In 1918, after the collapse of the Russian Empire, Bessarabia joined Romania. Orhei County existed as part of the Kingdom of Romania from 1918 to 1940 and 1941 to 1944. After the 1939 Molotov–Ribbentrop Pact, Bessarabia was occupied by the USSR in June 1940. Moldovan independence in 1991 revived Orhei County until 2003, when it became a district of Moldova.

Geography

The district is located in the central part of the Republic of Moldova. Neighboring districts include Rezina (north), Rîbnița and Dubăsari districts (east), Strășeni and Criuleni (south), and Călărași and Telenești (west). The land is divided into several orographic units: 
The Central Moldavian Plateau (forest), in the northeast, combines narrow, deep valleys and broad slopes.
The northern plain was created by soil erosion. This area has the lowest altitude, crossing the Răut and Cogâlnic rivers from north to south.
The western slope is gradual, with the east sloping more sharply towards the Dniester.

Climate
The district has a temperate continental climate with short, mild winters (average January temperature ) and long, warm summers (average July temperature ). Two-thirds of the annual precipitation falls as rain from April to November, and about one-third as snow and sleet from December to March.

Fauna

Mammals in the region include foxes, deer, red deer, wild boars, hedgehogs, badgers, rabbits, and wolves. Birds include crows, hawks, partridges, storks, and jays.

Flora
Forests occupy 20.1% of the district (24,277 hectares). Tree species in these forests include oak, English oak, ash, hornbeam, linden and willow. Local plants include fescue, clover, bell and knotweed.

Protected areas
There are nature reserves in Susleni, Pohrebeni and Trebujeni.

Hydrosphere

Rivers in the district include the Nistru, Răut, Vatici, Cula, and Cogâlnic. There are 162 lakes and ponds, covering . A spring in the village of Jeloboc has an output of  a second. The Nistru River (Dniester) has been harnessed for irrigation in the villages of Jora de Mijloc and Vîșcăuți. Near the village of Biești, geological surveys have found an aquifer large enough to supply the city of Orhei.

Administrative subdivisions

Localities: 75
Administrative center: Orhei
City: Orhei
Communes: 37
Villages: 37

Demographics
In January 2012 the district population was 125,800, with 26.6 percent in urban and 73.4 percent in rural areas.

Births (2010): 1,521 (12.1 per 1,000)
Deaths (2010): 1,694 (13.5 per 1,000)
Growth Rate (2010): -173 (−1.4 per 1,000)

Ethnic groups 

Footnote: * There is an ongoing controversy regarding the ethnic identification of Moldovans and Romanians.

Religion 
Christians – 98.4%
Orthodox Christians – 97.6%
Protestant – 0.8%
Baptists – 0.4%
Seventh-day Adventists – 0.2%
Evangelicals – 0.2%
Other – 1.2%
None 0.4%

Economy

There are 40,693 registered businesses in the district. Fifty-seven are public companies, 4,606 are privately owned, 40 have mixed public-and-private ownership and 14 are foreign-owned. Manufacturing and agriculture are the dominant sectors of the district economy. There are 30 industrial companies: 27 manufacturers and three mines. In 2009, there were 2,496 unemployed workers. Agricultural land comprises 82,238 ha (67 percent) of the total area. Arable land comprises 57,161 ha (46.5 percent) of agricultural land. Orchards make up 5,287 ha (4.3 percent), vineyards 4,461 ha (3.6 percent), pasture 13,288 ha (10.3 percent) and 27,305 ha (21.2 percent) are planted to other crops.

Education
The Orhei district has 69 educational institutions, and the total number of students is 15,160. There are 1,448 students in teachers' and medical colleges, and 685 students in professional schools.

Politics
The Orhei district has traditionally favored right-wing parties, primarily the AEI. The percentage of residents voting for the PCRM has dropped steadily over the last three elections, and the AEI increased 100.6 percent.

Elections

|-
!style="background-color:#E9E9E9" align=center colspan="2" valign=center|Parties and coalitions
!style="background-color:#E9E9E9" align=right|Votes
!style="background-color:#E9E9E9" align=right|%
!style="background-color:#E9E9E9" align=right|+/−
|-
| 
|align=left|Liberal Democratic Party of Moldova
|align="right"|21,991
|align="right"|37.49
|align="right"|+16.71
|-
| 
|align=left|Party of Communists of the Republic of Moldova
|align="right"|14,227
|align="right"|24.25
|align="right"|−5.26
|-
| 
|align=left|Democratic Party of Moldova
|align="right"|9,972
|align="right"|17,00
|align="right"|+0.07
|-
| 
|align=left|Liberal Party
|align="right"|5,758
|align="right"|9.81
|align="right"|−8.93
|-
| 
|align=left|Party Alliance Our Moldova
|align="right"|2,623
|align="right"|4.47
|align="right"|−3.48
|-
|bgcolor=#0033cc|
|align=left|European Action Movement
|align="right"|773
|align="right"|1.32
|align="right"|+1.32
|-
|bgcolor="grey"|
|align=left|Other parties
|align="right"|3,346
|align="right"|5.66
|align="right"|-0.43
|-
|align=left style="background-color:#E9E9E9" colspan="2"|Total (turnout 61.05%)
|width="30" align="right" style="background-color:#E9E9E9"|59,118
|width="30" align="right" style="background-color:#E9E9E9"|100.00
|width="30" align="right" style="background-color:#E9E9E9"|

Culture

The district has five museums, 60 public libraries and 62 community centres.

Health
Orhei District has a 430-bed hospital, a family-health center, 33 family practitioners' offices, 14 health centres, and 17 health offices. There are 246 physicians and 836 other healthcare professionals.

Notable residents

 Alecu Donici – Poet, storyteller and translator
 David Knut – Russian poet
 Iurie Platon – Russian painter and sculptor
 Jacobo Fijman – Argentine poet
 Meir Dizengoff – Politician and first mayor of Tel Aviv
 Paul Goma – Writer and anticommunist militant
 Sergey Lazo – Communist militant during the civil war in Russia, Siberia and the Far East 
 Sergiu Niță – Politician, attorney, minister for Basarabia in 1920–1921, 1926–1927

References

 District population per year
 Results of 2010 Parliamentary Election
 General description of the orhei district
 District site

See also
Orhei County (Moldova)

 
Districts of Moldova